Allegra Rose Edwards is an American television actress known for playing Cindy McCabe in the USA Network anthology series Briarpatch and Ingrid Kannerman in the Amazon Prime Video comedy Upload.

Early life
Edwards is originally from Denver, Colorado. She began modeling when she was 18 months old and continued to model, dance, and act throughout her childhood.

Career
Edwards studied theatre and television at Pepperdine University in Malibu. During her time at Pepperdine, she wrote scenes for Pepperdine's annual Songfest, performed with Pepperdine's Improv Troupe, and appeared in Tutor, a 2009 comedy short written and directed by Jeff Loveness.

After graduating from Pepperdine with her bachelor's degree in 2010, Edwards moved to San Francisco to attend the American Conservatory Theater's three-year Master of Fine Arts program, which she completed in 2013. After earning her MFA, she spent time in Los Angeles and New York City. In 2015, she performed in an off-Broadway production of "Everything You Touch."

In 2019, Edwards played Cindy McCabe in the USA Network anthology series Briarpatch. She stars as Ingrid Kannerman on the Amazon Prime Video comedy Upload that first aired in 2020.

Edwards has also appeared in episodes of Modern Family, New Girl, Friends from College, The Mindy Project, and Orange Is the New Black.

Personal life
Edwards lives in Los Angeles. She is married to actor Clayton Snyder.

Edwards and Snyder welcomed a son on July 12, 2022.

Filmography

References

External links

 
 

21st-century American actresses
Actresses from Denver
American television actresses
Living people
Pepperdine University alumni
1987 births